Cantu Addition is a census-designated place (CDP) in Brooks County, Texas, United States. Its population was 188 at the 2010 census.

Geography
Cantu Addition is located at  (27.201979, -98.153909).

Demographics
As of the census of 2000, 217 people, 77 households, and 56 families were residing in the CDP. The population density was 723.0 people/sq mi (279.3/km2). The 83 housing units averaged 276.6/sq mi (106.8/km2). The racial makeup of the CDP was 64.06% White, 0.92% Native American, 32.26% from other races, and 2.76% from two or more races. Hispanics or Latinos of any race were 94.47% of the population.

Of the 77 households,  48.1% had children under the age of 18 living with them, 49.4% were married couples] living together, 19.5% had a female householder with no husband present, and 26.0% were not families. About 23.4% of all households were made up of individuals, and 2.6% had someone living alone who was 65 years of age or older. The average household size was 2.82, and the average family size was 3.28.

In the CDP, the age distribution was 32.3% under 18, 10.6% from 18 to 24, 25.3% from 25 to 44, 25.3% from 45 to 64, and 6.5% who were 65  or older. The median age was 31 years. For every 100 females, there were 99.1 males. For every 100 females age 18 and over, there were 93.4 males.

The median income for a household in the CDP was $9,191, and for a family was $9,583. Males had a median income of $12,841 versus $16,250 for females. The per capita income for the CDP was $6,492. About 53.3% of families and 45.9% of the population were below the poverty line, including none of those under the age of 18 or 65 or over.

Education
Cantu Addition is served by the Brooks County Independent School District.

References

Census-designated places in Brooks County, Texas
Census-designated places in Texas